Julien Ielsch (born 5 March 1983) is a French former professional footballer who played as a defender.

He played on the professional level in Swiss Super League for Neuchâtel Xamax and in Ligue 2 for Stade Reims.

External links
 Julien Ielsch profile at Foot-National.com
 
 

1983 births
Living people
Sportspeople from Belfort
French footballers
French expatriate footballers
Expatriate footballers in Switzerland
Association football defenders
FC Sochaux-Montbéliard players
Neuchâtel Xamax FCS players
Stade de Reims players
Amiens SC players
Red Star F.C. players
Swiss Super League players
Ligue 1 players
Ligue 2 players
Championnat National players
French expatriate sportspeople in Switzerland
Footballers from Bourgogne-Franche-Comté